Andreas Taulany Haumahu, better known as Andre Taulany (born 17 September 1974) is an Indonesian actor, comedian, presenter and singer of mixed Batak and Moluccan descent. He is the former lead vocalists of Indonesian music group, Stinky.

Band
In 1992, he joined an Indonesian band called Stinky (before Slugi). He left the band in 2007.

Discography

 With Stinky

 Stinky (Album 1997) 
 JTD (Album 1998)
 Rindu Untuk Dia (Album 1999)
 Permata Hati (Album 2001)
 Stinky 5 (Album 2003)
 Langkah Terbaik (Album 2004)
 Album Tujuh (Album 2005)
 Pecinta Sejati (Album 2007)

 Solo Karier

 Andre (2000)
 Cintailah Istanaku (2005)
 Sayangku (singel 2015)
 Ayah (singel 2020)
 Bulan (singel 2021)

 With OVJ and Sule

 Bibirmu Dower (bersama SM#SH) (2011)
 Andeca Andeci (bersama 7 Ikans) (2011)
 Smile U don't Cry (bersama Sule) (2011)
 Potong Bebek Angsa (bersama Super Senior) (2012)
 Smile U don't Cry (remix) (bersama 3 Djanggo) (2013)
 Atitnya Tuh Disini (bersama Cita Citaku) (2014)

 With The Prediksi

 Orkes Prediksi (2021)

Filmography

TV Show

Sinetron 

 Masih Ada Cinta
 Cerita Cinta (1999)
 Bumi dan Langit 2002)
 Bintang Idola (2002)
 Cinta Pertama (2002)
 Terang Milikku Juga (2003-2004)
 Hidayah (2005-2006)
 Permana dan Permata (2005)
 Kiamat Sudah Dekat (2005-2007)
 Mansoor La Gokilun (2009)
 Mas Boy dan Lemon (2013)
 Para Pencari Tuhan Jilid 15 (2022)

FTV 

 FTV Hidayah MD
 Dadang Dudung
 Dadang Dudung 2
 Pencopet dan Pacarnya
 Lapor Pak! the Movie: Hilangnya Mahkota Atlantis
 Lapor Pak!: Telegram Rahasia

TV Show 

 Ngelenong Nyok
 Komedi Betawi
 Lenong.co.id
 Opera Van Java
 Sahurnya OVJ
 OVJ Awards
 OVJ Cup
 OVJ Roadshow
 Pelangi
 PAS Mantab
 The Promotor
 Mas Boy & Lemon
 Awas Ada Sule 2 
 Karoke Keliling
 Ini Talkshow
 Ini Sahur
 Comedy Night Live
 Pagi Pagi
 Alkisah
 Santuy Malam
 The Sultan Entertainment
 Ada Show
 Hangout with Andre
 Lapor Pak!
 Sahur Seger
 Pas Buka
 Pas Sore
 D'Cafe
 Bercanda Tapi Santai
 Bercanda Pagi
 Sahur Lebih Segerr
 Papa Rock n Roll

References

External links
 

Living people
1974 births
21st-century comedians
Indonesian actors
Indonesian male comedians
Indonesian comedians
21st-century Indonesian male singers
Musicians from Jakarta
20th-century Indonesian male singers